Peiper is a surname. Notable people with the surname include:

Allan Peiper (born 1960), Australian road cyclist and team manager
Joachim Peiper (1915–1976), German war criminal and SS leader
Tadeusz Peiper (1891–1969), Polish poet, art critic, and theoretician of literature

See also
Piper (surname)